Ioan Condruc (born 19 April 1951) was a Romanian former football player, who played for FC Baia Mare, UTA Arad and U Cluj. Condruc was the team captain during the FC Baia Mare golden period between 1977 and 1981.
Ioan Condruc played for UTA Arad when UTA won the championship title.
He was part of the team which played and eliminated Feyenoord Rotterdam from European Cup .

References

1951 births
Living people
People from Vișeu de Sus
Romanian footballers
CS Minaur Baia Mare (football) players
FC UTA Arad players
FC Universitatea Cluj players
Association football defenders